DTCC is a four-letter initialism for:

 Depository Trust & Clearing Corporation
 Delaware Technical Community College
 Danish Touring Car Championship